Keon is a masculine given name. Depending on its spelling it could be of Persian or Gaelic Irish origin. As, it is a common Persian given name meaning "king" or "realm". In English, it is a variant of the given name , meaning "ancient", originally from Gaelic Irish.

Given name
 Keon Alexander (born circa 1980s or 1990s), Canadian actor, sometimes credited as Keon Mohajeri
 Keon Broxton (born 1990), American baseball player
 Keon Clark (born 1975), former American National Basketball Association player
 Keon Daniel (born 1987), Trinidadian association footballer
 Keon Ellis (born 2000), American basketball player
 Keon Harding (born 1996), Barbadian cricketer
 Keon Johnson (born 1995), American player in the National Basketball Association
 Keon Joseph (born 1991), Guyanese cricketer
 Keon Lyn (born 1992), American cornerback in the Canadian Football League
 Keon Peters (born 1982), St Vincent cricketer
 Keon Raymond (born 1982), American linebacker in the Canadian Football League and National Football League

Surname
 Dave Keon (born 1940), Canadian ice hockey player
 Johnny Keon (1885–1921), Australian rules footballer
 Michael Keon (1918–2006), Australian political journalist and author
 Michael Marcos Keon (born 1954), Filipino politician
 Miles Gerald Keon (1821–1875), Irish Roman Catholic journalist and novelist
 Stan Keon (1915–1987), Australian politician
 Wilbert Keon (1935-2019), Canadian surgeon

See also
McKeon, Irish surname
Keanu (disambiguation)

Masculine given names